The 2015–16 Ligue Nationale du football Amateur is the fifth season of the league under its current title and fifth season under its current league division format. A total of 48 teams will be contesting the league. The league started on September 17, 2015.

League table

Group East

Group Centre

Group West

References

Ligue Nationale du Football Amateur seasons
3
Algeria